The Gulf Coast League Tourists or GCL Tourists were a minor league baseball club, that was an affiliate of the Pittsburgh Pirates during the 1970 season.

The team played in the rookie-level Gulf Coast League. The Tourists were the second Pirates' affiliate in the league, playing alongside the Gulf Coast League Pirates. The team's Tourists moniker was derived from the fact that they did not have a home field, only serving as a road club. The Tourists folded after their lone season.

1970 season

References

Baseball teams established in 1970
Baseball teams disestablished in 1970
Defunct Florida Complex League teams
G
1970 establishments in Florida
1970 disestablishments in Florida
Defunct baseball teams in Florida